"Time" is the fourth overall, and third official, single taken from British drum-and-bass duo Chase & Status' second studio album, No More Idols. The single features vocals from British singer Delilah. The single was released in the United Kingdom as a digital download on 29 April 2011. During March 2011, Chase & Status ran an online competition for fans to remix the track, with the winner's remix appearing on the digital bundle extended play. It was revealed on 31 March 2011 that the Kev Willow Remix had been crowned the winner of the competition, with the Primus Palas Remix and Enei Remix serving as the runners up.

Music video
The music video for the track depicts a family seen through the eyes of the eldest daughter. On the outside, the family are perfectly happy, but it is then revealed that the husband and wife have regular arguments that usually end in the husband beating the wife. The husband is finally arrested by the police, but when the family go to see him, the wife seems to completely forgive him. The video ends with the daughter leaving home, and hugging her mother goodbye, while the father lies in prison. After this, a picture appears advertising Refuge.

Track listing
 12" vinyl
 "Time" – 3:38
 "Time" (Wilkinson Remix) – 4:51

 Promotional CD single No. 1
 "Time" – 3:38
 "Time" (Instrumental) – 3:38

 Promotional CD single No. 2
 "Time" (C&S Champagne Bubbler Mix) – 4:35
 "Time" (Wilkinson Remix) – 4:51
 "Time" (Kamuki House Remix) – 4:20

 Digital download EP
 "Time" – 3:38
 "Time" (C&S Champagne Bubbler Mix) – 4:35
 "Time" (Wilkinson Remix) – 4:51
 "Time" (Kamuki House Remix) – 4:20
 "Time" (Kev Willow Remix) – 4:14

Chart performance
"Time" first made its appearance on the UK Singles Chart on 27 March 2011, where it debuted at number 40 on the dance chart. After four consecutive weeks of climbing the chart, "Time" debuted on the official singles chart at number 90; before climbing to number 58 the following week. On 7 May, the single climbed twenty places to number 38; marking the duo's fourth consecutive top forty hit. Upon release, the single climbed seventeen places to a current peak of number 21; also managing to reach a peak of number six on the dance chart.

Charts

Weekly charts

Year-end charts

Certifications

Release history

References

2011 singles
Chase & Status songs
Mercury Records singles
RAM Records singles
Song recordings produced by Chase & Status
Songs written by Plan B (musician)
Songs written by Saul Milton
Songs written by Will Kennard
2010 songs